The 2021 Cheltenham Gold Cup (known as the WellChild Gold Cup for sponsorship reasons) was the 93rd annual running of the Cheltenham Gold Cup horse race and was held at Cheltenham Racecourse, Gloucestershire, England, on 19 March 2021.

The race was won by Minella Indo ridden by Jack Kennedy and trained by Henry de Bromhead

Result

* The distances between the horses are shown in lengths† Trainers are based in Great Britain unless indicated. PU = pulled-up. F = fell

Details
 Sponsor: WellChild
 Winner's prize money:
 Going: Good to Soft
 Number of runners: 12
 Winner's time: 6 min 45.35 sec

References

External links
2021 Cheltenham Gold Cup at Racing Post

Cheltenham Gold Cup
 2021
Cheltenham Gold Cup
2020s in Gloucestershire
Cheltenham Gold Cup